Arthur Hacker  (St Pancras, Middlesex, 25 September 1858 – 12 November 1919 Kensington, London) was an English classicist painter.

Biography
Hacker was the son of Edward Hacker (1812–1905), a line engraver specialising in animal and sporting prints (who was also for many years the registrar of Births and Deaths for the Kentish Town sub-district of Pancras Registration District, Middlesex). In his art he was most known for painting religious scenes and portraits, and his art was also influenced by his extensive travels in Spain and North Africa. He studied at the Royal Academy between 1876 and 1880, and at the Atelier Bonnat in Paris. He was twice exhibited at the Royal Academy, in 1878 and 1910, and was elected an Academician in 1910. In 1894 he was the subject of a bust by Edward Onslow Ford. An original portrait by Hacker of Sir Alfred Keogh hangs in the RAMC HQ Mess at Millbank, London.

In 1902, Hacker built a new house at Heath End, Checkendon, Oxfordshire, called Hall Ingle, commissioning the young architect Maxwell Ayrton and carrying out the decorations himself.

Paintings on public display include The Annunciation at Tate Britain, Pelagia and Philammon in Liverpool's Walker Art Gallery, The Children's Prayer (1888), The Atkinson Museum, Southport and The Temptation of Sir Percival in Leeds City Art Gallery.

He is buried in Brookwood Cemetery.

References

External links
 
 

1858 births
1919 deaths
19th-century English painters
English male painters
20th-century English painters
Royal Academicians
Royal Society of Portrait Painters
19th-century English male artists
20th-century English male artists